Glumslöv is a locality situated in Landskrona Municipality, Skåne County, Sweden with 1,994 inhabitants in 2010. Notable natives from the area include Björn Strid & Peter Wildoer.

References 

Populated places in Landskrona Municipality
Populated places in Skåne County
Coastal cities and towns in Sweden